Upper Bush is a hamlet in the parish of Cuxton, in the unitary authority of Medway, in Kent, England.

The hamlet has only a few houses, including two Grade II listed buildings; Barrow Hill House  and High Birch 

The North Downs Way long-distance path leads through the village, between Cuxton and Upper Halling.

References

External links

Villages in Kent